The California Interscholastic Federation-Southern Section (CIF-SS) is the governing body for high school athletics in most of Southern California and is the largest of the ten sections that comprise the California Interscholastic Federation (CIF). Its membership includes most public and private high schools in Orange, Los Angeles, Riverside, San Bernardino, Ventura, and central and southern Santa Barbara counties. At the start of the 2018/9 season, 13 schools from San Luis Obispo County and northern Santa Barbara County left the Southern Section to join the much smaller CIF Central Section.  Teams from the Los Angeles Unified School District (LAUSD) and surrounding areas have competed in the CIF Los Angeles City Section since 1935. CIFSS's offices are located in Los Alamitos.

Founded in 1913, the CIF Southern Section includes over 565 member public and private high schools and is by far the largest CIF section. Three of the ten CIF sections are individual current or former public school districts (Los Angeles, San Francisco and Oakland). The Southern Section's membership includes all private schools located within the service area of the LAUSD, which includes almost all of the city of Los Angeles plus some adjacent areas outside the city limits. If the CIF Southern Section were a state association, it would be the 10th largest in the United States.

For its first year of operation, the organization was called the Southern California Interscholastic Athletic Council (SCIAC). That acronym was taken over by the Southern California Intercollegiate Athletic Conference in 1915 after the Southern Section name was established. CIF was officially formed in 1914 and became statewide in 1917. The service area was larger, encompassing what is now the CIF Los Angeles City Section, which broke off in 1935, and the CIF San Diego Section which broke off in 1960. Imperial County was once part of the section as well, but broke off in 2000 to join the San Diego Section.  At various points in time, schools in Arizona, Nevada, and Tijuana, Baja California, Mexico, were part of the section.

Commissioners

 Seth F. Van Patten (1913-1951)
 William W. Russell (1951-1954)
 J. Kenneth Fagans (1954-1975)
 Thomas E. Byrnes (1975-1980)
 Ray J. Plutko (1980-1986)
 Stan Thomas (1986-1993)
 Dean Crowley (1993-1999)
 James Staunton, Ed.D. (1999 - 2011)
 Rob Wigod (2011 to present)

History

The Southern Section was the outgrowth of a track and field meet. The Southern Section was founded on 
March 29, 1913, when a group of high school officials joined forces to conduct a track championship meet.  Seth F. Van Patten, who served as Track Manager for the Southern Section in 1913 and is recognized as 
the founding father of the CIF-SS, served in that post until 1928 when he was officially named Secretary of the organization. He 
served as Commissioner until his retirement in 1951.
On March 28, 1914, the Southern Section came under the administrative wing of the newly founded California Interscholastic 
Federation, and has since grown into one of the most progressive and respected organizations of its kind in the world.
CIF-SS archives date back over 100 years!
Despite its lengthy history, the Southern Section lists just nine Commissioners (the term Secretary dropped) with William Russell 
holding the post from 1951 to 1954, J. Kenneth Fagans being the administrative head from 1954 until his retirement in early 1975, 
Thomas E. Byrnes accepting the Commissioner's post in 1975, while Ray Plutko served from 1980 to 1986. Stan Thomas served as 
Commissioner from July, 1986 to October, 1993 when Dean Crowley was appointed Acting Commissioner and was Commissioner of 
Athletics from July, 1994 until his retirement in September, 1999. James Staunton Ed.D., served as Commissioner from September 
1, 1999, until his retirement on July 31, 2011. Rob Wigod, the current Commissioner, began his service as Commissioner on August 1, 2011, after having served as Assistant Commissioner for 11 years.

The “home” of the Southern Section has a varied history. At the outset, basements, surplus school rooms and even 
the homes of secretaries served as the official office. South Pasadena High School graciously permitted the use of one of its rooms 
during the 1930s, with Oneonta School and South Pasadena High School serving as the home office from 1942 until 1949.  There was a period of time the office was in the home of Commissioner Seth Van Patten.  Still without an official office, the Southern Section moved its supplies to Helms Hall, a bakery in Culver City in 1949 and remained at the Venice 
Blvd. site until 1959.  It was in February of that year that the Southern Section built its first ever administration office, 
located on the corners of Carmona and West Washington in Los Angeles. As membership grew and the Sections’ population center 
moved, so did the CIF-SS office. In 1965, the Section office built and moved into its third home and second devoted strictly to the 
CIF-SS day-to-day operations. That space was located next to Gahr High School on Artesia Blvd. in the city of Cerritos. That remained the home base of the 
section until October 2002 when the ever-expanding membership required a larger facility. Thus, the new and current administrative 
home became the Pine Street location in Los Alamitos.

The California Interscholastic Federation, Southern Section, is a non-profit corporation organized to direct and control both boys 
and girls athletics in the secondary schools within the Section. The Southern Section is administered on a day-to-day basis by the 
Commissioner, five Assistant Commissioners, a chief Financial Officer, a Marketing Manager and a staff of eight support personnel. The Southern Section is not 
only the oldest, but the largest of 10 such sections in the state—its membership has grown from an original 30 schools to over 560+
schools and from 5 leagues to almost 90 leagues.

Sports
CIF-SS sponsors the following sports:

Fall Season
American Football (11-man) (divided into 13 divisions)
8-man football (2 divisions)
Competitive Traditional Cheer
Cross country (5 divisions)
Field Hockey
Girls Volleyball (9 divisions)
Girls Tennis (5 divisions)
Boys Water Polo (7 divisions)
Girls Golf (4 divisions)

Winter Season
 Boys Basketball (10 divisions)
 Girls Basketball (10 Divisions)
Soccer (Boys and Girls) (7 divisions)
Girls Water Polo (7 divisions)
Boys Wrestling (7 Divisions)
 Girls Wrestling (7 divisions)

Spring Season
Baseball (7 Divisions)
Badminton
Boys Golf (6 Divisions)
Gymnastics
Lacrosse (Boys and Girls) (2 Divisions) 
Softball (7 Divisions)
Swimming (Boys and Girls - 4 Divisions)
Boys Tennis (5 Divisions)
Track and Field (Boys and Girls - 4 Divisions)
Boys Volleyball (6 Divisions)

Leagues

 605 League
 Academy League
 Agape League
 Almont League
 Ambassador League
 Angelus League (football only)
 Arrowhead League
 Arrowhead Athletic Conference
 Baseline League
 Bay League
 Big 4 League
 Big VIII League
 Camino Del Rey Association
 Camino Real League 
 Century Conference
 Channel League
 Citrus Belt League
 Citrus Coast League 
 Coast Valley League
 Coast View Conference
 Coastal League
 Coastal Canyon League
 Condor League
 Crestview League 
 Cross Valley League
 Del Rey League
 Del Rio League
 Desert Empire League
 Desert Sky League
 Desert Valley League
 Empire League
 Express League
 Foothill League
 Freeway League
 Frontier League
 Garden Grove League
 Gold Coast League
 Golden League
 Golden West League
 Hacienda League
 Harbor League
 Heritage League
 Horizon League
 Independence League
 Inland Valley League
 International League
 Ivy League
 Liberty League
 Los Angeles Athletic Association
 Majestic League
 Marmonte League
 Miramonte League
 Mission League
 Mission Valley League
 Mojave River League
 Montview League
 Moore League
 Mountain Pass League
 Mountain Valley League
 Mt. Baldy League
 Mulholland League
 National League
 North Hills League
 Ocean League
 Olympic League
 Omega League
 Orange League
 Orange Coast League
 Pacific League
 Pacific Valley League
 Pacific View League
 Pioneer League
 Palomares League
 Prep League
 Raincross Conference
 Rio Hondo League
 River Valley League
 San Andreas League
 Mid-Cities League
 Santa Fe League
 Sea View League
 Serra League
 South Coast League
 South Valley League
 Southwestern League
 Gateway League
 Sunbelt League
 Sunkist League
 Sunset League
 Sunshine League
 Surf League
 Trinity League
 Tri-County Athletic Association
 Tri-Valley League
 Valle Vista League
 Victory League
 Warrior League
 Wave League
 Western Athletic Conference

Source

Playoff divisions
In the post-season, schools in team based sports are divided into several divisions based on "competitive equity" or overall strength or success (or lack of) on the field, court or pool of play.  Each division plays a single elimination tournament to determine which team will advance to the Section tournament.

Boys Lacrosse: 3 Divisions

Baseball: 7 Divisions

Boys and Girls Basketball: Open, 1, 2A, 2AA, 3A, 3AA, 4A, 4AA, 5A, 5AA

Boys Golf: Central, Central Coast, Eastern, Northern, Southern, Western

Girls Golf: Central, Eastern, Northern, Southern

Boys and Girls Soccer: 7 Divisions

Boys and Girls Swimming and Diving: 4 Divisions

Boys Team Tennis: 5 Divisions

Boys and Girls Track and Field: 4 Divisions

Boys Volleyball: 6 Divisions

Boys and Girls Water Polo: 7 Divisions

Boys Wrestling: Central, Coastal, Eastern, Northern, Southern, Western

Cross Country: 5 Divisions

Girls Volleyball: 1A, 1AA, 2A, 2AA, 3A, 3AA, 4A, 4AA, 5A, 5AA

Girls Wrestling: Southern, Eastern, Northern, Central

Softball: 7 Divisions

11-Man Football: 13 Divisions

8-Man Football: Large, Small

Sponsors
CIF-SS's major sponsors include Southern California Ford Dealers, Spalding, Bally Sports West, CIF-SS Championship Merchandise, Rawlings, Kap7, Russell Athletic, Jack in the Box, Papa John's, Gatorade, Maxpreps, CSEA, Gamebreaker, CCPOA, Les Schwab, US Marines, Southern California PGA, HEAD Penn Tennis, H&L Corporation, and J&L Custom Jackets. CIFSS games are broadcast on Bally Sports West and webcast on Bally Sports PrepZone and NFHSNetwork.com and several other independent broadcast and streaming platforms.

References

External links

High school sports in California
Organizations based in California
Sports organizations established in 1913
High school sports associations in the United States
Sports governing bodies in the United States
California Interscholastic Federation sections
1913 establishments in California